The Assembly of the Autonomous Island of Mohéli is the island's legislative body.

The Assembly, formed following elections held on 14 and 21 March 2004, has a total of 10 members.

Elections

2004
Supporters of the Island President, Mohamed Said Fazul, won 9 seats while one seat was won by a supporter of Union President Azali Assoumani.

See also
Assembly of the Union of the Comoros
Assemblies of the Autonomous Islands of the Comoros
Assembly of the Autonomous Island of Anjouan
Assembly of the Autonomous Island of Grande Comore

Politics of the Comoros
Political organizations based in the Comoros
Government of the Comoros
Moheli
Mohéli
Moheli